Charles Koete  (d 1 October 2012) was the inaugural Anglican Bishop of Central Solomons, one of the nine dioceses that make up the Anglican Church of Melanesia. He served from 1997 to 2011.

References

Living people
21st-century Anglican bishops in Oceania
20th-century Anglican bishops in Oceania
Anglican bishops of Central Solomons
Year of birth missing (living people)